Morolica is a municipality in the Honduran department of Choluteca.

Founded in the late 19th century, Morolica was destroyed by flooding associated with Hurricane Mitch in October 1998.  The current Morolica, also known as New Morolica, is located in a valley some five kilometers from the original site.

The current mayor is Ever Gomez of the liberal party.  Morolica in its entirety accounts for some 6–7,000 people spread out over the city and its aldeas (villages), with around 1,200 living in the city itself.

Morolica possesses four churches: Evangelical, Baptist, Pentecostal, and Catholic.

The main industry is farming and the economy doesn't stretch much beyond that.  Possessing a kindergarten, elementary school, high school, public library, court, health center, census office, and mayor's office, the largest employer by far is the government.

Municipalities of the Choluteca Department